Judith Jacobs Tuttle, known professionally as Judy Jacobs (born September 27, 1957), is an American gospel musician. She started her music career when she attended Lee College in 1984, singing with the New Harvest singers and releasing her album in 1987 "Judy Jacobs: with New Harvest." published by Pathway Press. She has released eight more albums, since her first release, with two more labels New Day Records and Daywind Records. Two albums have charted on the Billboard magazine charts, which have exclusively come on the Gospel Albums chart.

Early life
Jacobs was born Judy Jacobs on September 27, 1957 in Lumberton, North Carolina, as the youngest of twelve siblings, and she commenced singing at the age of eight with The Jacobs Sisters. She attended Lee University, for her collegiate studies.

Music career
Her recording music career started in 1987 with the release of Judy Jacobs: With New Harvest" . She later released another album titled "No God Like Jehovah" in 2001 with her own label "His Song Ministries" She has released two albums that charted on the Billboard magazine Gospel Albums chart at No. 16 for Almighty Reigns that was released by His Song on November 22, 2005. With New Day Records, Jacobs released, I Feel a Change'', in 2011 that charted at No. 33 on the aforementioned chart.

Personal life
She is married to Jamie Tuttle. The couple are co-pastors of Dwelling Place Church International in Cleveland, Tennessee. They are the co-owners of the His Song Music Group label. Together they have two daughters, Erica and Kaylee.

Discography

Studio albums

References

External links
 Official website
 Cross Rhythms artist profile

1957 births
Living people
African-American songwriters
African-American Christians
Christians from North Carolina
Musicians from North Carolina
Musicians from Tennessee
Pentecostals from Tennessee
Songwriters from North Carolina
Songwriters from Tennessee
21st-century African-American people
20th-century African-American people